August Heinrich Ferdinand Tegetmeyer (14 March 1844 Leipzig – 31 May 1912) was a German illustrator and engraver who provided the images for a large number of publications.

References

External links

Natural history illustrators
German wood engravers
1844 births
1912 deaths
19th-century German painters
German male painters
20th-century German painters
20th-century German male artists
20th-century German printmakers
19th-century German male artists
20th-century engravers